Anthony Lun (born 12 April 1957) is a Hong Kong songwriter, arranger, musical director and singer who sings in Cantonese, Mandarin, Japanese and English.

Biography 

Anthony Lun is a graduate of La Salle College, Hong Kong, Santa Clara University (Bachelor of Arts) and University of Michigan (Masters of Music).

Upon returning to Hong Kong in 1986, Anthony released an album, "Anthony Lun's Composition Collection". However, he only came to the Hong Kong music industry's attention after winning the Asia Pacific Popular Song Contest the same year. He entered the competition at the initiation of Poon Kwong Pui who wrote the winning song, "Lyrics". The song is also available in his second, self-titled album. In 1990, he released an album called "Man Behind The Piano" and the song of the same title became a hit. 

Between 1989 and 1997, Anthony composed over 300 songs with 42 No. 1 hits. He composed songs performed by famous Asian artistes including Jackie Chan, Faye Wong, Sandy Lam, Anita Mui, Andy Lau, Aaron Kwok, Lui Fong, Alex To, Elisa Chan and Cass Phang.

In 1991, Anthony won the prestigious Golden Horse Film Festival and Awards in the Best Movie Theme category for soundtrack of the movie, "Au Revoir, Mon Amour" (Till We Meet Again). The notable theme song, "何日" (When) was sung by Anita Mui. In 2001, he also composed the score for an award-winning movie Peony Pavilion (遊園驚夢).

In 2004, he held a concert, "HKPO x Sandy x Anthony LIVE", with Sandy Lam at the Hong Kong Coliseum featuring the Hong Kong Philharmonic Orchestra.

Apart from working with good friend Sandy Lam, he is also known for his musical direction (for concerts) with Anita Mui, Andy Lau, Connie Chan Po-chu, Deanie Yip, Leon Lai, Sally Yeh and George Lam.

In 2005, Anthony and a well-known Taiwanese composer, Jonathan Lee produced a theme song for the Tsunami relief benefit performance organised by the Hong Kong Performing Artistes Guild.
In 2006, Anthony Lun returned to Hong Kong Coliseum in April for 2 solo concerts. 
In 2007, November, Anthony made his acting debut on the theater stage in a play called "Far Flower World".  The play was so well received that it was staged for 8 consecutive shows at APA in March 2008 with an all sold-out performances.  
In 2008, Anthony's first full-blown musical titled "Snow Queen" was staged in May at Kwai Tsing Theater.  Anthony wrote and orchestrated the music, with librettos by Chris Shum.  The musical was based on an Anderson fairy tale.
In 2009, Anthony began touring with Sandy Lam as her musical director and her guest in the concerts.

In 2009, Lun was part of the judging panel for season one of The Voice on TVB.

In 2013, Lun received the Hall Of Fame lifetime achievement award presented by the CASH, Composers and Authors Society of Hong Kong.

Lun is actively touring in concerts.

Awards

 1986 – Winner of the ABU Popular Song Contest with the song "Lyrics"
 1987 – Most Outstanding New Artist – Radio Hong Kong; Most Creative Pop Song of the year – "Lyrics" – RTHK
 1988 – Song of the Year – "Hot Red Lips" -Radio Hong Kong, Commercial Radio, TVB
 1990 – Best Arranger of the year – "Burn" – Commercial Radio, Radio Hong Kong, TVB; Best Composer of the year – "Burn" – Commercial Radio
 1991 – Best Male Vocalist of the year –  Commercial Radio; Best Movie Theme – " Au Revoir, Mon Amour" – Golden Horse Award; Gold Award – "Goodbye, My Love" – Asia Music Festival; Most Performed Work on Radio – "Heart Is Still Cold" – Composers and Authors Society of Hong Kong; Most Performed Work  – " Heart Is Still Cold" – Composers and Authors Society of Hong Kong; Best Producer of the year – Commercial Radio; Best Composer of the Year – Commercial Radio; Best Song of the Year – "Heart Is Still Cold" – TVB; Best Arranger of the Year – "Past Life" – TVB; Best Commercial of the Year – "Girodano" – Composers and Authors Society of Hong Kong
 1992 – Most Performed Song of the Year – "I Said I Want You To Be Happy" – Radio Hong Kong; Best Song of the Year – "Why Did I Let You Go?" – Radio Hong Kong
 2003 – Best Original Music for the Stage – "Scent of Resurrection”
 2008 – Best Duet with Juno Mak, "Write Too Much", Metro Radio
 2013 – CASH Hall Of Fame – Lifetime Achievement Award

Honors

 1987 – Representing Hong Kong at the ABU Popular Song Contest in New Zealand
 1988 – The song "Hot Red Lips" chosen to be performed at the Olympic Games in Seoul
 1990 – Guest Artist on NHK Special, Japan
 1991 – Guest Artist on NHK TV Special, Japan
 1992 – Guest Artist in Rock N' Roll Bandstand '90–'91, Hong Kong  
 1993 – Most Outstanding Youth of Hong Kong Award
 1994 – Guest on World Aids Special – NHK Special, Japan
 1994 – Guest Artist on NHK Special, Japan
 1994 – Cartier Achievement Award
 1997 – Guest artist representing Hong Kong in the 17th World Peace Festival, Osaka
 1998 – Composer Achievement – Commercial Radio

Public performances

 1988 – Solo Concert with the Hong Kong Philharmonic Orchestra (4 performances at Queen Elizabeth Stadium)
 1989 – Solo Concert with the Hong Kong Philharmonic Orchestra (3 performances at Hong Kong Coliseum)
 1990 – Solo Concert with the Hong Kong Philharmonic Orchestra (3 performances at Hong Kong Coliseum)
 1991 – Solo Concert with the Hong Kong Philharmonic Orchestra (2 performances at Hong Kong Coliseum)
 1994 – Solo Concert (3 performances at Hong Kong Coliseum); Solo Concert (1 performance at Garden Hall, Tokyo); Solo Concert (1 performance in Fukuoka, Japan – open air); Joint Concert with Sandy Lam (1 performance in Shenzhen, China); Guest artist at Anita Mui's MGM Grand Concert, Las Vegas
 1995 – Solo concert (19 performances in Kansai, Japan)
 1997 – Solo concert (12 performances in Kansai, Japan)
 1999 – Solo concert (9 performances in Kansai, Japan)
 2000 – Solo concert for Cathay Pacific Airlines (1 performance at Hong Kong International Airport – open air)
 2001 – Solo concert for AIA (1 performance at Hong Kong Coliseum)
 2002 – Solo concert for Manulife (1 performance at Kowloon Exhibition Hall); Solo concert for Singapore Airlines (1 performance at Hong Kong Exhibition Hall); Solo concert (1 performance at Trump Plaza in Atlantic City); Guest Appearance at Lam Man Yee Concert (1 performance at the Hong Kong Cultural Centre)
 2003 – Guest Appearance with the Hong Kong Chinese Orchestra (1 performance at the Hong Kong Cultural Centre); Guest Appearance with the Macau Chinese Orchestra (1 performance at the Macau Cultural Centre)
 2004 – Sandy Lam x Anthony Lun x Hong Kong Philharmonic Orchestra (5 performances at the Hong Kong Coliseum); Solo concert for the HKSAR (1 performance at the Hong Kong Government House)
 2006 – Solo Concert (2 performances at the Hong Kong Coliseum); Solo concert (1 performance at the Toronto Convention Hall); Solo concert (1 performance at the Vancouver Convention Hall)
 2013 – Solo Concert (2 performances at Queen Elizabeth Stadium)
 2016 – 2 concerts Red White and Blue (with Deanie Ip, Chiu Tsang Hei, HK Philharmonic Orchestra) at HK Convention Exhibition Centre
 2019 – Solo Concert with the Hong Kong Philharmonic Orchestra (4 performances at Hong Kong Culture Centre)

Work experience

 Solo artist – pop singer, pianist
 Album producer of artists such as Anita Mui, Sandy Lam, Lui Fong, Cass Phang, Andy Lau, KC Lee, Elisa Chan, Amanda Lee, Roman Tam, Face to Face, Joyce Lee, Janelle Wong, Julian Cheung, Andy Hui, Deanie Yip, Joey Yung
 Musical Director of Anita Mui, Sandy Lam, Leon Lai, Lui Fong, Sally Yeh, George Lam, Tsai Chin, Tsin Ting, Roman Tam, Deanie Yip, Pui Lui, Liu Yun, Wu Yingyin
 Composer and arranger of over 300 published works with 42 No. 1 hits from 1986 to 1997
 Film Score Composer – 6 movie scores in credits: 1. 說謊的女人 (I Am Sorry), 2. 我愛扭文柴 (Now You See Love, Now You Don't), 3. 何日君再來 (Au Revoir, Mon Amour), 4. 九一神鵰俠侶 (Saviour Of The Soul), 5. 李後主-部份配樂 (Emperor Li), 6.遊園驚夢 (Peony Pavilion)
 Teaching assistant at the University of Michigan, 1979 -1981
 Teaching assistant at the University of Santa Clara, 1975 -1979

Education

 Masters in Music – University of Michigan, 1981 (graduated with cum laude)
 Bachelor of Arts – University of Santa Clara, 1979 (graduated with cum laude)

Discography

 1986 – "Seek" (Kongo's)
 1986 – "Lyrics" (Capital Artists)
 1987 – "Anthony Lun" (Capital Artists)
 1990 – "Man Behind The Piano" (Bali Records)
 1990 – "Cheers For Love" (Bali Records)
 1992 – "One Voice Ten Fingers" (Golden Pony)
 1993 – "One Alone on the Road" (Golden Pony)
 1993 – "One Voice Ten Fingers" (Pony Canyon)
 1994 – "Time" (Golden Pony)
 1994 – "Listen" (Golden Pony)
 1995 – "Fields Of Heart" (Golden Pony)
 1995 – "Looking Glass" (Pony Canyon)
 1996 – "Second Life" (Golden Pony)
 1996 – "Don't Compare" (Pony Canyon)
 1997 – "A Song For You" (Golden Pony)
 1999 – "New Songs and Best Hits" (Golden Pony)
 1999 – "Summer of 1999" (Yamaha Records)
 2000 – "The Red Boat" (Hero Idea)
 2001 – "Anthony Lun Greatest Hits" (Golden Pony)
 2003 – "A Song For You" (Golden Pony)
 2003 – "Autumn Night" (EMI)
 2004 – "Under The Roof," Live concert for DVD (EMI)
 2006 – "A feeling Unsung" (Go East)
 2007 – "Live at Hong Kong Coliseum" DVD, CD (Opus Forever)
 2010 – The Best Of Best (Forward Music)

Footnotes
 Biography of Anthony Lun
 HKPO Press Release
 Tsunami Relief Theme

References

External links
 Affinity
 Zone de Pianoman – Anthony Lun (Archived 2009-10-25)
 One Voice Ten Fingers
 Anthony Lun's composition
 
 Anthony Lun in PinkWork (audio)

1957 births
Living people
Hong Kong musicians
Hong Kong male singer-songwriters
Santa Clara University alumni
University of Michigan School of Music, Theatre & Dance alumni